Anne Bouverot (born 21 March 1966) is a French business executive. She is currently Chairperson of the Board of Technicolor, provider of visual effects and animation services for moving images and supplier of set-top boxes and gateways. In August 2015, she was appointed chair and CEO of the French electronic security company Morpho after spending four years as director general and board member of the GSM Association (GSMA).

Early life and education
Anne Bouverot ascribes her international interests to the influence of her Canadian mother and her French father. Part of her schooling was in the United States where she learnt to read and write in English before turning to French. Bouverot attended the Ecole Normale Supérieure in Paris where she studied computer science leading to an M.S. and later a Ph.D in artificial intelligence (in 1991). She also graduated in telecommunications at Telecom ParisTech.

Career
In the early 1990s, Bouverot moved to Mexico as IT project manager for Telmex. From 1996, she worked for the U.S. company Global One until 2002 when she was appointed vice president at Equant's IT services unit. In 2004, she was chief of staff to the CEO of Orange in the UK, returning to Paris in 2007 to work on international business development with assignments in Kenya, Armenia, Tunisian and Portugal. She then became executive vice president, mobile services, for France Télécom Orange. In 2011, she was appointed director general and board member of GSMA, the global association of mobile operators. Her role as chair and CEO of Morpho was effective from 1 August 2015.

While she was with GSMA, Bouverot promoted initiatives for attracting more women to work in the mobile and ICT sectors, launching the Connected Women programme which hosts events around the world. She has also been instrumental in organizing the GSMA's Mobile World Congress in Barcelona. Held each year, the event attracts prominent speakers from the mobile and related fields.

Other activities
 Cellnex, Independent Member of the Board of Directors (since 2018)

References

1966 births
Living people
20th-century French businesswomen
20th-century French businesspeople
French business executives
French people of Canadian descent
French people of Hungarian descent
École Normale Supérieure alumni
Télécom Paris alumni
21st-century French businesswomen
21st-century French businesspeople